The Banff Mountain Book Festival is an annual book festival held at the Banff Centre in Banff, Canada.

Grand Prize
 1994: Chris Bonington and Audrey Saukeld (editors), Heroic Climbs
 1995: Thomas Wharton, Icefields
 1996: Stephen Venables, Himalaya Alpine-Style: The Most Challenging Routes on the Highest Peaks
 1997: Stefano Ardito, Mont Blanc: Discovery and Conquest of the Giant of the Alps
 1998: Audrey Salkeld, World Mountaineering: The World's Great Mountains
 1999: Paul Pritchard, The Totem Pole
 2000: Bradford Washburn, Bradford Washburn: Mountain Photography
 2001: Roger Hubank, Hazard's Way
 2002: W. H. Murray, The Evidence of Things Not Seen: A Mountaineer's Tale
 2003: David Roberts, Escape from Lucania: An Epic Story of Survival
 2004: Chris Duff, Southern Exposure: A Solo Sea Kayaking Journey Around New Zealand's South Island
 2005: Karsten Heuer, Being Caribou: Five Months on Foot with a Caribou Herd
 2006: Jeff Long, The Wall
 2007: James M. Tabor, Forever on the Mountain: The Truth Behind One of Mountaineering's Most Controversial and Mysterious Disasters
 2008: Sid Marty, The Black Grizzly of Whiskey Creek
 2009: Jerry Moffatt, Niall Grimes, Jerry Moffatt: Revelations
 2010: John Long, The Stonemasters: California Rock Climbers in the Seventies
 2011: Bernadette McDonald, Freedom Climbers
 2012: Philip Connors, Fire Season: Field Notes From a Wilderness Lookout
 2013: Tim Cope, On the Trail of Genghis Khan: An Epic Journey Through the Land of the Nomads
 2014: John Porter, One Day as a Tiger: Alex Macintyre and the Birth of Light and Fast Alpinism
 2015: Richard Wagamese, Medicine Walk
 2016: Jean McNeil, Ice Diaries: An Antarctic Memoir
 2017: Jim Herrington, The Climbers
2018: Paolo Cognetti, The Eight Mountains
2019: Bryce Andrews, The Life and Death of a Grizzly Bear
2020: Hank Lentfer, Raven's Witness: The Alaska Life of Richard K. Nelson

Other prizes

Best Book — Mountain Literature  
Best Book — Mountain Image   
Best Book — Adventure Travel  
Best Book — Mountaineering History  
Special Jury Mention  
Canadian Rockies Award

See also
Banff Mountain Film Festival
Boardman Tasker Prize for Mountain Literature

References

External links
Banff Mountain Festivals
Literary festivals in Alberta
Festivals in Banff, Alberta
Canadian literary awards
Outdoor literature awards
Awards established in 1995
1995 establishments in Alberta
Mountaineering festivals
Mountaineering in Canada